Amber McNaught is a British blogger, author and former local journalist. She is best known for her fashion blogs and for reviewing  Susan Boyle years before she gained fame on Britain's Got Talent.

Early history
After graduating from the University of Edinburgh in the late nineties with a Masters in English Literature, McNaught started working as an editorial assistant for the West Lothian Courier which is part of the Mirror group. After a short while, McNaught moved to a full-time reporting role for the West Lothian Herald & Post (owned by Johnston Press). In one of her more well-known articles, McNaught reviewed the first album that Susan Boyle ever sang on. After the Herald & Post production was downsized, McNaught moved to a role in public relations with West Lothian Council which was her final job before moving into the field of online publishing with the formation of her publishing company Hot Igloo Productions Ltd.

Freelancing
In the early 2000s, McNaught freelanced for a number of organisations including The Scotsman, The Edinburgh Evening News, Scotland on Sunday and Glenmorangie.  In the field of blogging, McNaught wrote regularly for the now defunct Shiny Media. During this period, McNaught founded her first fashion blogs.

Blogging

ForeverAmber is McNaught's blog and is a mix of fashion and lifestyle blogging. ForeverAmber was one of the most popular personal style blogs in the United Kingdom and was rated as a top UK fashion blog in the mid-2010s. McNaught is well known for her large collection of shoes and was interviewed on the Vanessa Feltz Show, as well as being featured in  multiple publications including: Office Magazine, Essentials Magazine, Company Magazine, Boden Style Guide, YouLookFab, ASOS, House of Fraser and She Magazine

Book writing
McNaught's piece on The Famous Five was also published in TWiTTERTiTTERS as part of a fundraising drive for Comic Relief in 2009.

In July 2016, McNaught released her first book My Blogging Secrets.

In 2017, McNaught was commissioned by The Quarto Group to write an illustrated guide to capsule wardrobes called Closet Essentials.  The book was released in October 2017.

References

Living people
Scottish bloggers
Scottish women writers
Scottish women bloggers
Writers of blogs about home and family
People from Whitburn, West Lothian
British fashion journalists
Scottish women journalists
Alumni of the University of Edinburgh
Year of birth missing (living people)